Zhanna Bupeeva (born April 29, 1993 in settlement Wolodarski in Astrakhan Oblast, Russia) is a Russian player in the Russian and Brazilian draughts. She was world champion in Russian draughts 2013 and 2017, took second place in 2007 (Brazilian draughts), 2011, 2015 and 2018, European champion in Russian draughts 2014 and 2016. Many times champion of Russia. Zhanna Bupeeva is Women's International grandmaster (GMIF) since 2008.

She graduated Astrakhan State Technical University in 2015 and is studying at Lesgaft National State University of Physical Education, Sport and Health.

References

External links
Zhanna Sarshaeva at cite Academy of chess and checkers art 

1993 births
Living people
Russian draughts players
Sportspeople from Astrakhan Oblast